Euglypha is a genus of cercozoa. It includes the species Euglypha rotunda.

References

External links
 
 

Cercozoa genera
Imbricatea